Center for the Arts Eagle Rock, formerly known as the Eagle Rock Branch Library and the Eagle Rock Community Cultural Center, is a historic Mission Revival and Spanish Colonial Revival style building in Eagle Rock, in north-central Los Angeles County, California.

Library
The building was built in 1915 as a Carnegie library, named the Eagle Rock Carnegie Library. The city of Eagle Rock was annexed to Los Angeles in 1923. The library was rebuilt in 1927, and became the Eagle Rock Branch Library in the Los Angeles Public Library system. The library was closed in 1981 when a larger, accessible facility opened.

History

In 1997 the Cultural Affairs Department established The Eagle Rock Community Cultural Center (ERCCC) to provide cultural events to the community.  The Eagle Rock Community Cultural Association soon began doing business as Center for the Arts Eagle Rock (CFAER), located at the corner of Colorado Boulevard and Rockland, one block west of Eagle Rock Boulevard, in the Eagle Rock district of Los Angeles.

The building was declared a Los Angeles Historic-Cultural Monument on 6/18/1985. It was listed on the National Register of Historic Places in 1987.

See also
List of Los Angeles Historic-Cultural Monuments on the East and Northeast Sides

References

External links
Center for the Arts Eagle Rock
Eagle Rock Branch Library (current building) - Los Angeles Public Library

Library buildings completed in 1915
Library buildings completed in 1927
Carnegie libraries in California
Libraries on the National Register of Historic Places in Los Angeles
Los Angeles Historic-Cultural Monuments
Mission Revival architecture in California
Spanish Colonial Revival architecture in California
Tourist attractions in Los Angeles
Eagle Rock, Los Angeles